Melicope obovata, also called Makawao melicope or ovate melicope, was a species of plant in the family Rutaceae. It was endemic to the Hawaiian Islands.

References

obovata
Endemic flora of Hawaii
Extinct flora of Hawaii
Plant extinctions since 1500
Taxonomy articles created by Polbot